The National Rural Letter Carriers' Association (NRLCA) is an American labor union that represents the rural letter carriers of the United States Postal Service. According to its statutes, the purpose of the Association is to "improve the methods used by rural letter carriers, to benefit their conditions of labor with the United States Postal Service (USPS), and to promote a fraternal spirit among its members."

Membership
To join the NRLCA, one must be employed by the USPS in the rural carrier craft as a Rural Carrier Associate (RCA), Substitute Rural Carrier, Rural Carrier Relief (RCR), Part-time Flexible (PTF), Assistant Rural Carriers (ARC) or Regular Carrier (Designation Code 71). The NRLCA provides information and fellowship for its members at county, district, state and national meetings where all members may participate in a democratic process of developing Association policy. The NRLCA provides a monthly publication, The National Rural Letter Carrier, to keep its members informed on postal and legislative matters of interest.

History
Free mail delivery began in American cities in 1863 with a limited scope. Shortly afterwards, rural citizens began petitioning for equal consideration. Postmaster General John Wanamaker first suggested rural free delivery (RFD) of mail in the United States in his annual report for fiscal year 1891. It began in 1896 with five routes, and the first rural carriers were paid $300 per year for their services. Seven years later, it had expanded to 15,119 routes covering 322,618 miles, however, inadequate pay was still an issue. The NRLCA was formed in 1903 at a cost of fifty cents per year in dues to its members.

In 1906, rural carriers were granted six national holidays. Christmas was not one of them, and did not become a holiday for rural carriers until 1923. In 1924, a special association committee traveled to Washington, D.C. to lobby for an equipment maintenance allowance (EMA). The following year, it became law. In 1928, the NRLCA implemented term limits for its officers, however, term limits were repealed in 1932. In 1941, tire and gasoline rationing from World War II affected rural carriers. NRLCA President Walker gained some exemptions from rationing for rural carriers. In 1946, the National Association of Letter Carriers (NALC) expressed interest in incorporating RFD into their union. In 1947, the NRLCA declined.

On January 17, 1962, President John F. Kennedy signed executive order 10988 establishing employee-management cooperation in the federal service. Rural carriers selected the NRLCA as their agent, and on July 12, the NRLCA became the first postal union to sign a national exclusive contract with the Post Office. To qualify, unions needed to demonstrate that they did not discriminate based upon race. Thus, the stipulation that only white delegates shall be eligible to seats in the national convention was quietly lifted from article 3 of the NRLCA's constitution without the passing of a resolution or bylaw. Separate gender pay was also abolished in a ruling by Attorney General Robert F. Kennedy.

On September 8, 1978, the NRLCA was the first postal union to come to an agreement on a new contract when contract negotiations between the USPS and its unions nearly resulted in an illegal mail strike.

On November 14, 2008, the NRLCA withdrew support from the Quality of Work Life/Employee Involvement (QWL/EI) program. As the Postal Service funded all QWL-EI activities, it became more focused on issues supporting corporate goals. The NRLCA saw QWL/EI headed in a different direction than improving the "quality of work life" for rural carriers and managers alike. On December 12, 2008, the Postal Service confirmed that QWL/EI will be closed entirely. As NRLCA President Don Cantriel put it, "They were looking for an excuse to get rid of it; we gave it to them."

On August 19, 2011, the NRLCA became the first labor union in the history of the United States Postal Service to elect a female President, Jeanette Dwyer, at its 107th National Convention in Savannah, Georgia. She served until 2018, when she chose not to run for re-election, and was succeeded by her Vice President, Ronnie Stutts. Dwyer rejoined the board to fill the remainder of Johnny Miller's unexpired term on November 21, 2020.

NRLCA Constitution

The NRLCA ratified its first constitution on day two of its first national convention in Chicago, Illinois, September 12, 1903. Henry Haven Windsor, editor of Popular Mechanics magazine as well as the RFD News (now The National Rural Letter Carrier) and chair of the Constitution & Bylaws Committee, presented his committee's report, followed by discussion on each article. One of the many topics discussed was union dues. Originally, the NRLCA sought one dollar a year from its members, however, this was negotiated down to fifty cents a year by the time this constitution was ratified (In 1910, dues were raised to 75 cents per year. The following year, it was reduced back down to 50 cents a year. It took until 1919, for dues to reach the dollar originally sought). The articles were amended and approved in order, and after adoption of each separate article, the entire constitution was voted upon and adopted in its entirety.

In 2007, bylaws were eliminated from the NRLCA Constitution, and each state was directed by the National office to do the same with their state constitutions. Existing bylaws were incorporated within the constitution in their appropriate places. As a result, the NRLCA constitution underwent some renumbering. In 2011, the NRLCA ratified a national steward system.

National convention
The NRLCA held its first annual national convention in Chicago, Illinois, September 11–12, 1903. The first officers elected to serve the NRLCA on day two of the NRLCA's first national convention (September 12, 1903) were:
President: Frank H. Cunningham (Omaha, Nebraska)
Vice President: B. Pitts Woods (Cherokee, Iowa)
Secretary: W. F. Tumber (Lockport, New York)
Treasurer: W. L. Fetters (Bluffton, Indiana)
Executive Committee: H. E. Niven (Berthoud, Colorado), F. A. Putnam (Dudley, Massachusetts) and E. Dwyer (Aurora, Illinois)

In 1908, women attended the NRLCA national convention for the first time. During World War II, the convention was limited to a small conference in St. Paul, Minnesota in 1942, and Cincinnati, Ohio the following two years. In 1945, a National Board Session was held in lieu of a delegate gathering. In attendance were 52 delegates from fifteen states. The host state was represented by the most delegates with thirteen, followed by Michigan with twelve. Indiana and Nebraska both had five, Missouri had four, Iowa had three, Minnesota, New York and Ohio each had two and Colorado, Georgia, Massachusetts and Wisconsin all had one. While represented by the NRLCA, neither Kansas nor Oklahoma had a representative in attendance.

The 2020 convention, which was set to take place in Spokane, Washington August 18–21 was canceled due to COVID-19, as was the 2021 convention. The only other year a national convention was not held was 1918, when it was canceled due to World War I.

Contract with the USPS

The NRLCA negotiates all labor agreements for the rural carrier craft with the Postal Service, including salaries. Rural carriers are considered bargaining unit employees in the USPS. This means that there is a contract between the Postal Service and the NRLCA. Only the NRLCA can represent members of the rural carrier craft in the grievance procedure, including providing protection in disciplinary actions.

Following the establishment of executive order 10988 in 1962, the NRLCA and USPS established their first national agreement on a contract for rural carriers. As a result of this contract, the Heavy Duty Agreement, or Evaluated Pay System was established (Rural Carriers are paid a salary based upon an evaluation of their particular route. Credit is given to all carriers' duties and compensated accordingly). On August 12, 1970, President Richard Nixon signed the Postal Reorganization Act (PRA). The Post Office Department became the United States Postal Service, and the NRLCA became a union, with collective bargaining rights for wages and fringe benefits.

When the 2007 contract between the NRLCA and USPS expired, rural carriers were operating without a contract for nearly two years. With the contract set to expire in December 2010, at midnight, November 20, 2010, negotiations between the NRLCA and USPS on a new contract ended in an impasse, and went into third party arbitrator.

On July 3, 2012, arbitrator Jack Clarke imposed a new contract upon the NRLCA and USPS that ran through 2015. Concessions by the NRLCA in the new contract mirrored concessions made by the APWU a year earlier. NRLCA Director of Labor Relations Joey Johnson voted with the USPS arbitrator to accept the contract despite a two-year wage freeze, a two-tiered wage structure and increased health care costs (from 19% to 24%). Substitute rural carriers and RCAs hired under the new contract faced a twenty percent cut in pay with no cost-of-living increases. New hire pay was cut from $19.45 to $15.56 per hour.

On April 25, 2016, President Jeanette Dwyer met with Postmaster General Megan Brennan and other postal officials at USPS headquarters for the signing of a new national agreement to run to 2018. It is the first negotiated agreement between the Postal Service and NRLCA in more than 20 years not to go to arbitration. NRLCA members ratified the agreement in April with 83% of votes cast in favor.

NRLCA presidents

NRLCA-PAC

The Political Action Committee (NRLCA-PAC) was created in 1975 to represent rural letter carrier interests on Capitol Hill by lobbying key government officials and staff on privatization of the postal service, five-day delivery and other issues affecting rural carriers. NRLCA-PAC supports members currently in Congress who are friendly to its positions, gains access to members who are on key congressional committees whose jurisdiction affects issues that are important to the rural carrier craft, and develops relationships with current and new congressional candidates. NRLCA-PAC also educates and alerts NRLCA membership on key issues & developments and encourages rural carriers to become involved legislatively.

Six-day delivery
In the 1970s, Postmaster General Benjamin F. Bailar suggested five-day delivery as a means of battling high energy costs resulting from the Organization of Arab Petroleum Exporting Countries' (OAPEC) embargo that resulted in a worldwide oil crisis. The NRLCA opposed five-day delivery; a bill to block five-day delivery was introduced by Rep. James M. Hanley (D-NY).

On January 28, 2009, Postmaster General John E. Potter testified before the Senate that if the Postal Service is not able to readjust their payment toward the pre-funding of retiree health benefits, as mandated by the Postal Accountability & Enhancement Act of 2006, the USPS would be forced to consider cutting delivery to five days per week during the summer months of June, July & August.

On June 10, 2009, the NRLCA, along with other union and management groups of the United States Postal Service, was contacted for its input on the study of the impact of five-day delivery along with developing an implementation plan for a five-day service plan. On July 30, 2009, President Don Cantriel voiced opposition to five-day delivery before the House Oversight & Government Reform subcommittee.

On September 30, 2009, the House of Representatives and Senate passed and signed into law H.R. 22, reducing the amount the United States Postal Service pays into the Postal Service Retiree Health Benefits Fund from $5.4 billion to $1.4 billion. PMG Potter continued to unveil a plan to eliminate Saturday mail delivery, regardless. On Thursday, April 15, 2010, PMG Potter testified before the House Committee on Oversight & Government Reform that by the year 2020, the USPS cumulative losses could exceed $238 billion, and that mail volume would drop 15% from 2009.

Postmaster General Patrick R. Donahoe echoed his predecessor's views on five-day delivery when he assumed office in 2011. On February 6, 2013, Donahoe announced that the Postal Service would implement five-day mail delivery beginning August 5, a move he claimed would save $2 billion annually. Later the same day, the NRLCA national board voted unanimously to call for his dismissal, as the universal service obligation and six-day delivery are upheld by Congressional language within Appropriations legislation. Therefore, a reduction in service would require action from the House and Senate. July 16, the House passed the Financial Services and General Government Appropriations bill, which included language protecting six‐day mail delivery, thereby blocking Donahoe's plan. He retired on November 14, 2014.

His replacement, the first female Postmaster General Megan Brennan, has been non-committal on five-day versus six-day delivery. While the issue remains on the table in her seeking of an overhaul postal laws, she has stated that she wants to focus on "similarities before differences" as she works with stakeholders, including postal employee unions, to craft her approach to Congress. President Barack Obama's Fiscal Year 2016 budget endorsed the outgoing PMG Donahoe's proposed plan to eliminate six‐day mail delivery.

Privatization

On December 17, 2017, President Donald Trump criticized the postal service's relationship with Amazon. In a post on Twitter, the President stated: "Why is the United States Post Office, which is losing many billions of dollars a year, while charging Amazon and others so little to deliver their packages, making Amazon richer and the Post Office dumber and poorer? Should be charging MUCH MORE!" On June 21, 2018, the President proposed a sweeping government reorganization that would sharpen the focus on workforce training, consolidate government-assistance programs and shrink federal agencies. As part of this proposal, he recommended restructuring the postal service with an eye toward privatization. According to his proposal, privatization would cut costs and give the financially burdened agency greater flexibility in adjusting to the digital age.

In the Articles of Confederation of the United States Constitution, Congress possessed the power to establish and regulate post offices (Article 1, Section 8, Clause 7), but does not specify how it is funded. The NRLCA fully opposes privatizing the Postal Service, and has publicly supported House Bill 993 and Senate Bill 933 that would prevent privatization.

CDS
Contract Delivery Service (CDS) is purchased on a contractual basis by the U.S. Postal Service whereby mail is carried from one USPS specified starting point to another, via highway, by private carriers. CDS carriers are not USPS employees, but are independent contractors who provide mail service on these routes. The NRLCA believes that contract delivery inhibits the security, sanctity and service of the USPS, and believes that Congress should support H.Res. 282 and S. 1457.

Annual food drive
Beginning in 1993, the NALC, Campbell Soup, Valpak, United Way of America, Second Harvest, the AFL-CIO & cartoonist Bil Keane have partnered for the largest single day food collection in the nation. Originally held Mothers' Day weekend, the Stamp Out Hunger Food Drive was switched to the second Saturday in May in 2022. May was chosen because most food banks face a depletion in donations from the holiday season.

In 2010, the NRLCA became a full partner in the annual drive (though the NRLCA had participated in the drive from its inception). The food drive was not held in 2020 or 2021 due to COVID-19.

Other rural carrier unions

In 1920, a secession from the NRLCA resulted in the forming of the National Federation of Rural Letter Carriers; in 1946, the NFRLC merged into the larger NALC. The National Alliance of Postal Employees was formed in 1913 by black employees of the Railway Mail Service. Although the Union was organized to prevent the elimination of blacks from the railway mail service, in 1923, the NAPE became the first industrial union in the United States when it opened its membership to any postal employee who desired to join, regardless of race, sex, creed or religion. The NAPE allowed membership to all eligible postal employees of all crafts, rural carriers included.

See also

National Association of Letter Carriers
National Postal Mail Handlers Union
National Alliance of Postal and Federal Employees
American Postal Workers Union
Canadian Postmasters and Assistants Association

References 

Mail carriers
Trade unions established in 1903
Postal trade unions
Trade unions in the United States
United States Postal Service